The Argyle Sweater is an American daily comic strip written by Scott Hilburn, a native of Garland, Texas. The strip has been syndicated by Universal Press Syndicate (now Andrews McMeel Syndication) since April 2008.

The comic bears a strong resemblance to Gary Larson's The Far Side comic, and Hilburn acknowledges this. In 2008, he told the Houston Chronicle, "There's no doubt that I was heavily influenced by Larson. He's one of the greats." Hilburn also lists among his influences cartoons in The New Yorker and National Lampoon magazines as well as cartoonists Sam Gross, Tom Cheney, and Jack Ziegler.

References

External links
Official site

American comic strips
2008 comics debuts
Gag-a-day comics
Surreal comedy
Gag cartoon comics